Silene antirrhina is a species of flowering plant in the family Caryophyllaceae known by the common names sleepy silene and sleepy catchfly. It is native to the Americas, where it is widespread throughout North America and parts of South America. It is known in Europe as an introduced species.

It can be found in a wide range of habitat types, including disturbed and recently burned areas. It is sometimes weedy.

Description
Silene antirrhina is quite variable in appearance, its morphology depending on several environmental factors, such as moisture level and available nutrients. In general it is an annual herb growing erect to a maximum height near 80 centimeters.

The slender stem grows from a taproot and branches near the top. There are dark-colored internodes on the stem, the upper ones often glandular in sticky in texture. Insects become trapped in the sticky patches on this protocarnivorous plant, but it does not obtain any nutrients from them. The lance-shaped leaves are up to 6 centimeters long near the base of the stem, and are smaller and narrower farther up.

The flower is enveloped in an inflated ovate calyx of fused sepals with ten veins. The calyx is open at the top, often revealing five double-lobed petals in shades of pink, red, or purple to white; the petals are sometimes absent.

References

External links
Jepson Manual Treatment: Silene antirrhina
Washington Burke Museum
Missouri Plants
Flora of North America
SEINet

antirrhina
Flora of the United States
Flora of Canada
Flora of the Western United States
Flora of the Eastern United States
Flora of the West Coast of the United States
Flora of British Columbia
Flora of California
Flora of New Mexico
Flora of the Sonoran Deserts
Flora of the California desert regions
Flora of the Cascade Range
Flora of the Klamath Mountains
Flora of the Sierra Nevada (United States)
Natural history of the California chaparral and woodlands
Natural history of the Colorado Desert
Natural history of the Mojave Desert
Plants described in 1753
Taxa named by Carl Linnaeus
Flora without expected TNC conservation status